The 1978–79 FIBA Korać Cup was the eighth edition of FIBA's Korać Cup basketball competition. The Yugoslav Partizan defeated the Italian Arrigoni Rieti in the final on March 20, 1979 in Belgrade, Serbia. This was Partizan's second consecutive win and the fourth consecutive win for a Yugoslav team.

First round

|}

Second round

|}

Automatically qualified to round of 16
  Partizan (title holder)
  Arrigoni Rieti

Round of 16

Semi finals

|}

Final
March 20, Hala Pionir, Belgrade

|}

External links
 1978–79 FIBA Korać Cup @ linguasport.com
1978–79 FIBA Korać Cup

1978–79
1978–79 in European basketball